Koïma  is a village in the Commune of Gao in the Cercle of Gao in the Gao Region of south-eastern Mali. It lies on the Niger River.

External links
Satellite map

Populated places in Gao Region
Communities on the Niger River